The 1984–85 Arkansas Razorbacks men's basketball team represented the University of Arkansas during the 1984–85 NCAA Division I men's basketball season. The head coach was Eddie Sutton, serving for his 11th and final year. The team played its home games in Barnhill Arena in Fayetteville, Arkansas. This team finished second in the SWC regular season standings. As No. 9 seed in the West region of the 1985 NCAA Tournament, the Razorbacks defeated Iowa in the opening round before losing to eventual Final Four participant St. John's in the second round. Arkansas finished with a record of 22–13 (10–6 SWC).

Roster

Schedule and results

|-
!colspan=9 style=| Regular Season

|-
!colspan=9 style=| SWC Tournament

|-
!colspan=9 style=| NCAA Tournament

Rankings

Awards and honors
Joe Kleine – Honorable Mention AP All-American

1985 NBA Draft

References

Arkansas Razorbacks men's basketball seasons
Arkansas
Arkansas
1984 in sports in Arkansas
1985 in sports in Arkansas